Ronald Wright Routledge (born 14 October 1937) was an English professional footballer who played as a goalkeeper for Sunderland.

References

1937 births
Sportspeople from Ashington
Footballers from Northumberland
English footballers
Association football goalkeepers
Sunderland A.F.C. players
Bradford (Park Avenue) A.F.C. players
Ashington A.F.C. players
English Football League players
Living people